Metfield is a village in Suffolk, England, but its name is derived from Medefeld or 'Meadow feld' (see Concise Oxford Dictionary of English Place Names). It is situated close to the border with Norfolk, being approximately 5 miles south east of Harleston and 7 miles north west of Halesworth. The population was estimated to be 370 in 1996, increasing to 388 at the 2011 Census.

The parish church is the 13th-century church of St. John the Baptist, which was extensively remodelled in the 15th century. St. John the Baptist has a sister parish in Medfield, Massachusetts in the United States, the Church of the Advent. The town is named after Metfield.

The Village has had no public house since 2007, when the only pub, The Duke William, closed. In May 2013 the pub re-opened as a successful Tea Room. During early 2014, the Tea Rooms expanded into a Bed and Breakfast along with a shop. Currently (2021) only B&B is available. 

During World War II an airfield was built just outside Metfield for use by the USAAF 491st Bomb Group and the 353d Fighter Group. On 15 July 1944 a bomb dump blew up, detonating over 1,000 tons of bombs and explosive, killing five men and wrecking five B-24  bombers.

The local economy is mainly agricultural with some light industry.

The village now has its own website at metfieldsuffolk.com .

In November 2017, local author Christine Brennan published her book METFIELD Tales From a Suffolk Village 1928–2017.

Nearby villages include Cratfield.

References

External links 

Metfield
St John the Baptist Church, Metfield
Diss Express - village's local newspaper website
a description of the explosion at the dump

Villages in Suffolk
Mid Suffolk District
Civil parishes in Suffolk